The Wind River is a stream in Yamhill County in the U.S. state of Oregon. Wind River enters Agency Creek, a tributary of the South Yamhill River, west of Spirit Mountain and north of Grand Ronde.

See also
 List of rivers of Oregon

References

Rivers of Yamhill County, Oregon
Rivers of Oregon